Castor is a mountain in the Pennine Alps on the border between Valais, Switzerland and the Aosta Valley in Italy. It is the higher of a pair of twin peaks, the other being Pollux, named after the Gemini twins of Roman mythology.

Ascents are usually made from the alpine hut Capanna Quintino Sella on the Italian side, by means of the Felikjoch and the long and narrow southeast ridge.  From the Swiss side, ascents start from Klein Matterhorn and go by way of the Italian glacier Grand Glacier of Verra and the mountain's west flank. The first ascent was made on August 23, 1861.

Image gallery

See also

List of 4000 metre peaks of the Alps

References

External links
Castor on Summitpost

Alpine four-thousanders
Mountains of the Alps
Mountains of Italy
Mountains of Switzerland
Pennine Alps
Italy–Switzerland border
International mountains of Europe
Mountains of Valais
Four-thousanders of Switzerland